Group 5 was an FIA motor racing classification which was applied to four distinct categories during the years 1966 to 1982. Initially Group 5 regulations defined a Special Touring Car category and from 1970 to 1971 the classification was applied to limited production Sports Cars restricted to 5 litre engine capacity. The Group 5 Sports Car category was redefined in 1972 to exclude the minimum production requirement and limit engine capacity to 3 litres. From 1976 to 1982 Group 5 was for Special Production Cars, a liberal silhouette formula based on homologated production vehicles.

1st Generation Group 5 – "Special Touring Cars" (1966 to 1969)
In 1966 the FIA introduced a number of new racing categories including one for highly modified touring cars, officially known as Group 5 Special Touring Cars. The regulations permitted vehicle modifications beyond those allowed in the concurrent Group 1 and Group 2 Touring Car categories. Group 5 regulations were adopted for the British Saloon Car Championship from 1966  and for the European Touring Car Championship from 1968.
The Special Touring Cars category was discontinued after the 1969 season.

2nd Generation Group 5 - "Sports Cars" (1970 to 1971)

For the 1970 season, the FIA applied the Group 5 classification to the Sports Car class which had previously been known as Group 4 Sports Cars. The minimum production requirement remained at 25 and the engine capacity maximum at 5 litres as had applied in the superseded Group 4.
Group 5 Sports Cars contested the FIA's International Championship for Makes in 1970 & 1971, alongside the 3 litre Group 6 Prototype Sports Cars.

During 1970 the FIA decided to replace the existing Group 5 Sports Car category when the rules expired at the end of the 1971 season, so the big 917s and 512s would have to be retired at the end of that year. Surprisingly, Ferrari decided to give up any official effort with the 512 in order to prepare for the new 1972 season regulations. But many 512s were still raced by private teams, most of them converted to M specification. As a result of the rule change, sports car racing popularity suffered and did not recover until the following decade, with the advent of Group C which incidentally were forced out of competition in favour of the 3.5 atmo engine formula, reminiscent of events nineteen years previous.

Background to the 5 Litre Sports Car category 
In an effort to reduce the speeds generated at Le Mans and other fast circuits of the day by the unlimited capacity Group 6 Prototypes such as the 7 litre Fords, and to entice manufacturers of 3 litre Formula One engines into endurance racing, the Commission Sportive Internationale (then the independent competition arm of the FIA) announced that the new International Championship for Makes would be run for Group 6 Sports-Prototypes limited to 3 litre capacity for the four years from 1968 through 1971.

Well-aware that few manufacturers were ready to immediately take up the challenge, the CSI also allowed the participation of 5 litre Group 4 Sports Cars manufactured in quantities of at least 50 units. This targeted existing cars like the aging Ford GT40 and the newer Lola T70 coupe.

In April 1968, the CSI announced that, as there were still too few entries in the 3 litres Group 6 Prototype category, the minimal production figure to compete in the Group 4 Sport category of the International Championship of Makes would be reduced from 50 to 25 starting in 1969 through to the planned end of the rules in 1971. This was mainly to allow the homologation in Group 4 of cars such as the Ferrari 250 LM and the Lola T70 which had not been manufactured in sufficient quantities to qualify (unless, in the case of the Lola T70, the open Can-Am cars were counted as well).

Starting in July 1968, Porsche made a surprising and very expensive effort to take advantage of this rule. As they were rebuilding race cars with new chassis every race or two anyway, they decided to conceive, design and build 25 versions of a whole new car for the Sport category with one underlying goal: to win its first overall victory in the 24 Hours of Le Mans. In only ten months the Porsche 917 was developed, based upon the Porsche 908, with remarkable technology: Porsche's first 12-cylinder engine, and many components made of titanium, magnesium and exotic alloys that had been developed for lightweight hillclimb racers. Other ways of weight reduction were rather simple, like a gear lever knob made of Balsa wood.

When Porsche was first visited by the CSI inspectors only three cars were completed, while 18 were being assembled and seven additional sets of parts were present. Porsche argued that if they assembled the cars they would then have to take them apart again to prepare the cars for racing. The inspectors refused the homologation and asked to see 25 assembled and working cars.

On April 20 Ferdinand Piëch displayed 25 917s parked in front of the Porsche factory to the CSI inspectors. Piëch even offered the opportunity to drive one of the cars, which was declined.

During June 1969, Enzo Ferrari sold half of his stock to FIAT, and used some of that money to do what Porsche did 6 months earlier with the 917, to build 25 cars powered by a 5-litre V12 in order to compete against them. With the financial help of Fiat, that risky investment was made, and surplus cars were intended to be sold to racing customers to compete for the 1970 season. Within 9 months Ferrari manufactured 25 512S cars.

Ferrari entries only consisted of the factory cars, tuned by SpA SEFAC and there were the private cars of Scuderia Filipinetti, N.A.R.T., Écurie Francorchamps, Scuderia Picchio Rosso, Gelo Racing Team and Escuderia Montjuich which not receive the same support from the factory. They were considered as field fillers, never as candidate for a win. At Porsche, however, JWA Gulf, KG Salzburg who were then replaced by Martini Racing for the following season, received all direct factory support and the privateers like AAW Shell Racing and David Piper Racing received a much better support than Ferrari's clients.

The 917 instability problem was resolved with a revised rear hatch, which was called 917K (Kurzheck). There was a long tail version known as the 917LH (Langheck). Towards the end of the 1970 season, Ferrari entered some races with a new version of the 512, the 512M which had a revised bodywork

3rd Generation Group 5 – "Sports Cars" (1972 to 1975)

For 1972, the FIA applied the Group 5 classification to what had previously been known as the Group 6 Prototype Sports Cars category. These cars, now officially Group 5 Sports Cars, were limited to a 3-litre engine capacity and were to be the main competitors in events counting towards the FIA's newly renamed World Championship for Makes from 1972 to 1975. Unlike the old Group 5, there was no minimum production requirement.

4th Generation Group 5 – "Special Production Cars" (1976 to 1982)

For the 1976 season the FIA introduced a new Group 5 "Special Production Car" category, allowing extensive modifications to production based vehicles which were homologated in FIA Groups 1 through 4. These cars would contest the World Championship for Makes series from 1976 through to 1980 and then the World Endurance Championship in 1981 & 1982. The FIA rules restricted the width of the car, therefore cars were built with standard body widths but wide mudguard extensions. The regulation required only the bonnet, roof, doors and rail panel were left unmodified. The rules however did not mention headlight heights, therefore when Porsche originally were to enter the 935 with the production headlight, they read the rules and discovered the loophole, therefore they raced the 935 with the hallmark flat nose. The category was also mostly associated with the wide boxy wheel arches and extravagant body style. The category would be banished after 1982 in favour of the Group B regulation, but continued to compete in JSPC, IMSA GTX category and other national sports car racing championships for a few more years. The only non-circuit events that used Group 5 cars were in the Giro D'Italia Automobilistico rally.

Group 5 cars
Cars homologated by the FIA as Group 5 cars included the following:

1st Generation
 Abarth 1000 TC
 Alfa Romeo 1600 GTA
 BMW 2002
 Ford Escort Twin Cam
 Mercedes Benz 300SEL
 Porsche 911
 BMC Mini Cooper S 999 cc

2nd Generation
 Porsche 917 (includes the Kurzheck (K), Langheck (LH), widebody shortnose 917/20)
 Ferrari 512M/S
 Lola T70
 Ford GT40 Mk 1

3rd Generation
 Ferrari 312P
 March 73S
 March 74S 
 March 75S
 Matra-Simca MS670
 Mirage M6
 Alfa Romeo T33TT/12
 Alpine A441
 Renault Alpine A442

4th Generation
 Porsche 935 (includes the 935-77, 935-78 known as the Moby-Dick and the customer Kremer K3 and K4 and the JLP variation)
 BMW 320i Turbo
 Carma FF
 Dallara Icsunonove
 Toyota Celica LB Turbo (RA22) (1st generation)
 Dome Celica Turbo (RA45) (2nd generation)
 TOM'S Corolla G5 (A40)
 Nissan Skyline RS Silhouette Formula
 Nissan Nichira Impul Silvia (two nose variations)
 Mazda RX-7 252i
 Mazda RX-7 253/253i/253SR
 Mazda RX-7 254/254i
 Nissan Bluebird SSS Turbo
 BMW 3.5 CSL
 BMW M1
 Lancia Stratos Turbo
 Lancia Beta Montecarlo Turbo
 Ferrari 512 BB LM
 Zakspeed Ford Capri Turbo
 Ford Escort Zakspeed
 Zakspeed Lotus Europa Gr.5
 Greenwood Widebody Corvette

Racing Series that included FIA Group 5 cars

1st Generation
 European Touring Car Championship (1968 to 1969)
 British Touring Car Championship (1966 to 1969)

2nd Generation
 International Championship for Makes (1970 to 1971)
 Interserie

3rd Generation
 World Championship for Makes (1972 to 1975)

4th Generation
 World Championship for Makes (1976 to 1980)
 World Endurance Championship (1981 to 1982)
 Deutsche Rennsport Meisterschaft
 IMSA GTX
 All Japan Sports Prototype Championship
 Fuji Super Silhouette Series (1979 to 1984)
  (1986-?)
  (1977-80)
 Giro d'Italia automobilistico

Groups 1-9

References

External links
 FIA Group 5 Special Production Car regulations for 1976 Retrieved from www.fia.com on 27 January 2008
 Group 5 Stratos info
 Zakspeed Ford Capri Turbo info
 QV500.com info on M1 Gr.5

Sports car racing
Fédération Internationale de l'Automobile
24 Hours of Le Mans
Racing car classes